Richard Vincent Whelan (January 28, 1809 – July 7, 1874) was an American prelate of the Roman Catholic Church. He served as bishop of the Diocese of Richmond in Virginia (1841–1850) and as bishop of the Diocese of Wheeling in West Virginia (1850–1874).

Biography

Early life 
Richard Whelan was born on January 28, 1809, in Baltimore, Maryland.  At age ten, he was enrolled at Mount St. Mary's College in Emmitsburg, Maryland where he studied the classics. Following his graduation with the highest honors in 1826, Whelan completed his theological studies at the Seminary of Saint-Sulpice in Paris, France.

Priesthood 
Whelan was ordained to the priesthood for the Diocese of Richmond by Bishop Jean-François-Étienne Borderies in Versailles, France, on May 1, 1831.Returning to Maryland, Whelan became a faculty member and business manager at Mount St. Mary's, and also served as pastor of a parish in Harper's Ferry, then in Virginia. His pastoral responsibilities included missions at Martinsburg, Winchester and Bath, all in Virginia at that time These communities, separated by long distances, contained many families who could not access Catholic institutions of any kind.

Bishop of Richmond 
On December 19, 1840, Whelan was appointed the second bishop of the Diocese Richmond by Pope Gregory XVI. He received his episcopal consecration on March 21, 1841, from Archbishop Samuel Eccleston, with Bishops Benedict Fenwick and John Hughes serving as co-consecrators, at Baltimore.

Since the departure of Bishop Patrick Kelly in 1822, the Diocese of Richmond had been vacant. During that period, Richmond had become a stronghold of the Know-Nothing political party, known for its anti-Catholic bigoty and violence.  The diocese only had six priests.

Soon after his arrival in Richmond, Whelan appealed to the Societies for the Propagation of the Faith in Paris, Lyon, France, and Vienna in the Austrian Empire to recruit priests for the diocese. He also established a seminary college outside Richmond, where he resided and taught classes whenever he was in town. Wheland also established several parishes, missions and schools.

Bishop of Wheeling 
In 1848, Whelan petitioned Pope Pius IX to divide the Diocese of Richmond into two dioceses, with the Allegheny Mountains serving as the boundary. The pope erected the new Diocese of Wheeling on the western slope of the Alleghenies on July 19, 1850, and  appointed Whelan on July 23, 1850, as its first bishop.  Pope Pius named John McGill as the new bishop of Richmond.

The new Diocese of Wheeling had only two or four Catholic churches and two or six Catholic priests. It consisted of several distinct valleys, with many immigrants but limited funds and access to social services. Whelan became known for his resourcefulness, even performing carpentry and stonework himself. He also had to deal with anti-Catholicism or Know-Nothings in the diocese.  When a papal nuncio was scheduled to visit in Wheeling in 1853, Whelan was worried about his security.  When the nuncio arrived, Whelan ringed the cathedral with supporters to protect him.

In 1861, the State of Virginia seceded from the United States to join the Confederate States of America at the start of the American Civil War.  However, public sentiment in the Wheeling area opposed secession.  A group established the Restored Government of Virginia in Wheeling and elected lawyer Francis H. Pierpont as its provisional governor.  Whelan believed the Restored Government was illegitimate and refused to take a loyalty oath to it.  In response, the Wheeling government wanted to arrest him.  However, U.S. President Abraham Lincoln refused to allow it.  Secretary of War Edwin M. Stanton sent a letter to the Restored Government on May 21, 1862, saying:"The President being informed that you intend or threaten to arrest Bishop Whelan, the Catholic Bishop of your city, he directs that you take no action against the Bishop without the President's order." No actions were taken against Whelan during the course of the war.  The Diocese of Wheeling became part of the new State of West Virginia in 1863.

Whelan invited several religious congregations to send followers to the diocese to provide needed social services. By the time he died, the diocese had 48 churches, 29 priests, three religious congregations of women, six schools for girls, a school for boys, an orphanage, and a hospital. From 1869 to 1870, Whelan attended the First Vatican Council in Rome, where he opposed papal infallibility because he thought such a declaration would be untimely.

Death and legacy
Whelan fell ill in 1874 and was brought to St. Agnes Hospital in Baltimore for treatment.  Richard Whelan died in Baltimore on June 7, 1874, at age 65. A residence hall at Wheeling Jesuit University in Wheeling is named after him.

Other sources
Tricia Pyne, Faith in the Mountains: A History of the Diocese of Wheeling-Charleston (2000)

References

1809 births
1874 deaths
Roman Catholic bishops of Richmond
Roman Catholic bishops of Wheeling–Charleston
19th-century Roman Catholic bishops in the United States
Mount St. Mary's University alumni
Religious leaders from Baltimore
Seminary of Saint-Sulpice (France) alumni